Thomas G. Wilson (June 3, 1890 – March 7, 1953), nicknamed "Slats", was a catcher in Major League Baseball who appeared in one game for the Washington Senators in its 1914 season.

External links

Major League Baseball catchers
Washington Senators (1901–1960) players
Galveston Pirates players
Galveston Sand Crabs players
Beaumont Oilers players
Baseball players from Kansas
People from Crawford County, Kansas
1890 births
1953 deaths